Respect M.E. (short for Respect Missy Elliott) is the first greatest hits album by American rapper Missy Elliott. It was released by Atlantic Records on September 4, 2006, in Europe, Asia and Australia. The album includes a collection of the singles from across all six of her studio albums, released between 1997 and 2005, most of which were produced by Elliott along with Timbaland, with "We Run This," the third single from her 2005 album The Cookbook also serving as Respect M.E.s lead single.

Upon release, the album earned favorable reviews from music critics who ranked it among the best hip hop compilations be released in the early to mid-2000s. A moderate commercial success, it became Elliott's second top ten album on the UK Albums Chart and her highest-charting album to date, peaking at number seven. Respect M.E. also reached the top in New Zealand and was later certified Gold in Ireland, New Zealand, and the United Kingdom.

Background
Respect M.E. compromises a collection of Ellitt's singles from across all six of her studio albums, released between 1997 and 2005. Missing from the collection is the single "Take Away" from her third album Miss E... So Addictive (2001). Speculation about two new tracks on the album began soon after its announcement. Two tracks called "123" and "Magnifica" were supposed to be included. "123" was even able to be pre-ordered as a CD single from UK music store HMV. However, these songs did not make the album.

Critical reception

AllMusic editor Andy Kellman rated the album five out of five stars and called it "one of the great decade-long singles runs is straightforwardly documented." He found that "although each one of Elliott's albums is well worth owning, nothing can deny the need for this release, which includes almost every noteworthy track she released during the period [...] During these years, there was no greater force in popular music." Pitchfork critic Jess Harvell noted that Respect M.E. is "the long-awaited — and long-deserved – best of. It is, amazingly, only being released in Europe. This is unconscionable. The suits at Missy's American label need to have their knuckles rapped, Catechism-style."

Fiona Jerome from MusicOMH called Respect M.E. a "great greatest hits package [...]. Pruning perhaps four numbers from it would raise it from four to five stars, but that is a minor niggle. From the soulful phrasings of the charmingly dirty "Minute Man" to the magnificent, symphonic shifts of "Lose Control," Respect M.E. is a testament to a truly gifted woman." Gigwises Will Lavin felt that "no greatest hits collection released in the last few years has come even close to this satisfactory collection of hot Missy Elliot records [...] Elliot is an icon, there's absolutely no doubt about it." Alex Burden from The Skinny called it "a powerhouse of an album."

Chart performance
Respect M.E. debuted and peaked at number seven on the UK Albums Chart. This marked Elliott's highest-charting album yet. On September 29, 2006, it was certified Gold by the British Phonographic Industry (BPI), for sales of over 100,000 units in the United Kingdom. Elsewhere, the album reached the top ten in New Zealand, also peaking at number seven.

Track listing

Personnel

 Timbaland       ― production 
 Missy Elliott   ― production 
 D-Man               ― production 
 Nisan Stewart   ― production 
 Rhemario Webber     ― production 
 Warryn Campbell ― production

Charts

Certifications

References

2006 greatest hits albums
Albums produced by Craig Brockman
Albums produced by Missy Elliott
Albums produced by Timbaland
Albums produced by Warryn Campbell
Missy Elliott compilation albums
Atlantic Records compilation albums